Phola, or Upriver Phula, is a dialect cluster of the Loloish languages spoken by the Phula people of China.

Phola proper is spoken by 13,000 people.

Alo Phola is spoken by 500 people in the village of Tuguozhai 土锅寨, Dashuiping Community 大水平村, Lijiang Township 澧江镇, Yuanjiang County, Yunnan, where they are surrounded by Dai speakers.

Phala is spoken by 12,000 people out of an ethnic population of 13,000.

The representative Phola dialect studied in Pelkey (2011) is that of Luodie 罗垤, Wadie Township 洼垤乡, Yuanjiang County.

References

Loloish languages
Languages of China